Black Point may refer to:

Places

Antarctica
Black Point (Antarctica), a place in Antarctica

Australia
Black Point (South Australia), a headland on the Yorke Peninsula
Black Point, South Australia, locality 
Black Point (Western Australia), the coastal western boundary of the D'Entrecasteaux National Park

Bahamas
Black Point (Bahamas), a district of Bahamas

Canada
Black Point, Cape Breton Island, Victoria County, Nova Scotia
Black Point, Halifax, a community in the Halifax Regional Municipality
Black Point, Pictou County, a community in Pictou County

Hong Kong
 Black Point, Hong Kong - located in Lung Kwu Tan and home to Black Point Power Station

United States
(by state then city)
Black Point, California, the name of an unincorporated area near Novato
Black Point (Sonoma County, California), a headland and surfing beach near Sea Ranch
Black Point (San Francisco), now part of the Aquatic Park Historic District
Honolulu Tudor–French Norman Cottages, a house at 4109 Black Point Road, Honolulu, Hawaii, listed on the National Register of Historic Places in Hawaii
Black Point (Linn, Wisconsin), an estate listed on the National Register of Historic Places in Wisconsin

Other uses
Black point (disease), a fungal disease of grain
Black Point (film), a 2001 movie
Black Point (ship), a ship sunk by the 
Black point compensation, a digital photography printing technique
Black Point (artist), Dominican rapper
Black Point, a pen name for manga author Takehiko Itō
SHG Black Point, a video game console